Drycothaea cribrata is a species of beetle in the family Cerambycidae. It was described by Bates in 1881. It is known from Honduras, Mexico and Guatemala.

References

Calliini
Beetles described in 1881